USS SC-696 was an SC-497-Class Submarine chaser of the United States Navy during World War II. She was sunk on 23 August 1943 by German dive bombers.

Ship History
She was ordered on 16 February 1942, laid down at Daytona Beach, Florida on 26 March 1942 by Daytona Beach Boat Works Inc. and launched on 6 August 1942. On 25 November 1942 she was commissioned as USS PC-696. In April, she was re-designated as USS SC-696. On 23 August 1943, off Palermo, Italy, SC-696 and  came under attack by Junkers Ju 88 dive bombers. Both were sunk. 18 men were killed aboard the 696.

Decorations
SC-696 received one battle star for her service.

European-African-Middle Eastern Campaign Medal
American Campaign Medal

References

Ships of the United States Navy
1942 ships